Alberto Martins, GCL (born 25 April 1945), is a Portuguese lawyer and politician.

He was a Deputy to the Assembly of the Republic in the V, VI, VII, VIII, IX, X and XI Legislatures, President of the Parliamentary Committee for Constitutional Affairs, Rights and Liberties between 1995 and 1999, President of the Portuguese Delegation to the Parliamentary Assembly of the Council of Europe and the WEU and Vice-President of their Members of Parliament (VIII Legislature) and President of the Parliamentary Group of the Socialist Party. He quit the Assembly of the Republic in 2017.

He was made Grand Cross of the Order of Liberty in 1999.

Published works
"New Citizen's Rights' (Don Quixote, 1994)
'Right to Citizenship ", (Don, 2000 - Lisbon)
Source Assembly of the Republic

Government posts
From 25 October 1999 to 6 April 2002 Minister for State Reform and Public Administration of the XIV Constitutional Government
Minister of Justice of the XVIII Constitutional Government

References

CV on Portugal Government Website

1945 births
Living people
Socialist Party (Portugal) politicians
Members of the Assembly of the Republic (Portugal)
20th-century Portuguese lawyers
People from Guimarães